Bourne End is the name of more than one place.  It is an old English name, referring to the point where two rivers join.

Places
In the United Kingdom:

Bourne End, Bletsoe, Bedfordshire, England
Bourne End, Cranfield, Bedfordshire, England
Bourne End, Buckinghamshire, England (Bourne End upon Thames)
Bourne End, Hertfordshire, England

Other uses
Bourne End Academy, Bourne End, Buckinghamshire, England, UK; a secondary school
Bourne End railway station, Bourne End, Buckinghamshire, England, UK; 
Bourne End Railway Bridge, Bourne End, Buckinghamshire, England, UK; over the River Thames

See also

 Wooburn and Bourne End, Buckinghamshire, England, UK; a civil parish
 Bourne End rail crash (1945) at Bourne End turnout, Hemel, Hempstead, England, UK
 
 Bourne (disambiguation)
 End (disambiguation)